Guicel "Willie"  Camper was an African-American giant who was born in Memphis, Tennessee. By the time of his death at the age of 18, he reached a billed height of 8 ft 7 in. He wore size 32 shoes. He died of a heart attack in 1943 while performing in Martinez, California. He is the 4th tallest verified man in human history. 

Born in the Memphis, Tennessee area, Camper grew up to become a performer. It was theorized by his doctors and his family that even up to his death, he never stopped growing.

See also
 Gigantism
 List of tallest people

References

People with gigantism
1943 deaths
1924 births
People from Memphis, Tennessee